Iodoacetone is an organoiodine compound with the chemical formula  The substance is a colorless liquid under normal conditions, soluble in ethanol.

Synthesis
The reaction of acetone and iodine produces iodoacetone. The reaction is typically acid catalysed and first order with respect to acetone and the acid catalyst: 

 +  -->  +

See also
Bromoacetone
Chloroacetone
Fluoroacetone
Thioacetone

References

Organoiodides
Lachrymatory agents
Ketones